The Upper Paunglaung Dam is a gravity dam on the Paunglaung River, about  east of Pyinmana on the border of Naypyidaw Union Territory and Shan State, Burma. The primary purpose of the dam is hydroelectric power generation, provided by the power station it supports. Preliminary construction on the dam site began in January 2005 and roller-compacted concrete placement for the dam commenced in October 2010. The dam was completed and impounded its reservoir in december 2015. It is expected to regulate the river and improve power generation at the downstream Lower Paunglaung Dam.

The dam forced the relocation of some 15,000 residents which has drawn backlash from locals to international organizations. Many have already relocated but complain that their new land is of an insufficient size, has no power supply or natural resources to work.

AF-Consult Switzerland Ltd was the Owner's Designer for all project phases, including commissioning.

See also

Dams in Burma
 List of power stations in Burma

References

Dams in Myanmar
Hydroelectric power stations in Myanmar
Gravity dams
Buildings and structures in Naypyidaw
Buildings and structures in Shan State
Roller-compacted concrete dams